Lake Muskoka/Rankin Island Water Aerodrome  is located  northwest of Gravenhurst, Ontario, Canada.

See also
 List of airports in the Port Carling area

References

Registered aerodromes in Ontario
Seaplane bases in Ontario
Transport in the District Municipality of Muskoka